The National Society for Road Safety (NTF)  is a road traffic safety organization in Sweden. It was established in 1934.

References

External links
 official website 

1934 establishments in Sweden
Non-profit organizations based in Sweden
Organizations established in 1934
Transport in Sweden